Feminism or death is a book of essays about ecofeminism by Françoise d´Eaubonne. In it, d'Eaubonne first coined the term ecofeminism (l'eco-féminisme).

The book was published in 1974 by P. Horay, and an English translation by Ruth A. Hottell was released by Verso Books in 2022.

d´Eaubonne shows the commonality between the suppression of women and the suppression of nature.

Bibliography 

 Le féminisme ou la mort, P. Horay, Paris, 1974.   
 Feminism or death, Verso, London, 2022.

Further reading

References 

1974 non-fiction books
Books about feminism
French essay collections